Hugh Moffatt (19 February 1894 – 19 August 1961) was  a former Australian rules footballer who played with Richmond in the Victorian Football League (VFL).

Notes

External links 
		

1894 births
1961 deaths
Australian rules footballers from Victoria (Australia)
Australian Rules footballers: place kick exponents
Richmond Football Club players